The 2019 DTM Hockenheim round is a motor racing event for the Deutsche Tourenwagen Masters held between 4 and 5 May 2019. The event, part of the 33rd season of the DTM, was held at the Hockenheimring in Germany.

Results

Race 1

Qualifying

Race

 — Driver retired, but was classified as they completed 75% of the winner's race distance.

Race 2

Qualifying

Race

Championship standings

Drivers Championship

Teams Championship

Manufacturers Championship

 Note: Only the top five positions are included for three sets of standings.

See also
 2019 W Series Hockenheim round

References

External links
Official website

|- style="text-align:center"
|width="35%"|Previous race:
|width="30%"|Deutsche Tourenwagen Masters2019 season
|width="40%"|Next race:

Hockenheim DTM 1
DTM Hockenheim